Kentucky Route 343 (KY 343) is a  state highway in the U.S. state of Kentucky. The highway connects Fleming-Neon and McRoberts, within Letcher County.

Route description
KY 343 begins at an intersection with KY 317 (Main Street) in the western part of Fleming-Neon, within Letcher County. It travels to the east-southeast and curves to the east-northeast. It passes a U.S. Post Office before it crosses over Yonts Fork on the SP4 Robert "Bug" Smith Memorial Bridge. Here, it begins paralleling Wright Fork. The highway crosses over Wright Fork on the Lt. Col. Claude E. Hounshell Bridge. It curves to the northeast and crosses over the fork again on the Master Sgt. John K. Holland Bridge. It curves to the east-southeast and then back to the east-northeast before it enters McRoberts. It crosses over She Fork before passing a U.S. Post Office. It intersects the northern terminus of KY 3409 (Dunham Road). KY 343 crosses over Wright Fork twice more, on unnamed bridges, before it ends and McRoberts Road continues into the northeastern part of McRoberts.

Major intersections

See also

References

0343
Transportation in Letcher County, Kentucky